The 1975–76 daytime network television schedule for the three major English-language commercial broadcast networks in the United States covers the weekday and weekend daytime hours from September 1975 to August 1976.

Talk shows are highlighted in  yellow, local programming is white, reruns of older programming are orange, game shows are pink, soap operas are chartreuse, news programs are gold, children's programs are light purple and sports programs are light blue. New series are highlighted in bold.

The Public Broadcasting Service, was in operation, but the schedule was set by each local station.

Monday-Friday

Notes
ABC had a 6PM (ET)/5PM (CT) feed for their newscast, depending on stations' schedule.
The Edge of Night aired its final CBS broadcast on November 28, 1975. The serial moved to ABC on December 1, 1975 with a 90 minute episode; Although it aired in the 4PM (ET)/3PM (CT) timeslot, affiliates were allowed to air the program outside the scheduled timeslot, while affiliates in the Pacific Time Zone had a 12 Noon feed for the series.
In the Pacific Time Zone (from December 1975 to March 1977), ABC's lineup had its game shows aired in the morning, while the 12 Noon to 3 PM block featured The Edge of Night, Ryan's Hope, All My Children, One Life to Live, and General Hospital in succession.

Saturday

Sunday

By network

ABC

Returning series
The $10,000 Pyramid
ABC Evening News
AM America
All My Children
American Bandstand
Devlin 
The Edge of Night (moved from CBS)
General Hospital
Groovie Goolies 
Hong Kong Phooey 
Issues and Answers
Let's Make a Deal
Make a Wish
The New Adventures of Gilligan
One Life to Live
Rhyme and Reason
Ryan's Hope
Schoolhouse Rock!
Showoffs
Speed Buggy 
Super Friends 
These Are the Days 
You Don't Say!

New series
The $20,000 Pyramid
Break the Bank
Family Feud
Good Morning America
Happy Days 
Hot Seat
The Lost Saucer
The Neighbors
The Tom and Jerry Show
The Great Grape Ape Show
The Oddball Couple
Uncle Croc's Block

Not returning from 1974-75
The Big Showdown
Blankety Blanks
The Brady Bunch 
The Girl in My Life
Goober and the Ghost Chasers 
Korg: 70,000 B.C.
Lassie's Rescue Rangers 
The Money Maze
The Newlywed Game 
Password 
Split Second
Yogi's Gang

CBS

Returning series
As the World Turns
The Bugs Bunny/Road Runner Hour
Camera Three
Captain Kangaroo
CBS Children's Film Festival
CBS Evening News
CBS Morning News
The Edge of Night (moved to ABC)
Face the Nation
Fat Albert and the Cosby Kids
Gambit
Guiding Light
The Harlem Globetrotters Popcorn Machine 
Lamp Unto My Feet
Look Up and Live
Love of Life
Match Game
Musical Chairs
The Pebbles and Bamm-Bamm Show 
The Price Is Right
Scooby-Doo, Where Are You! 
Search for Tomorrow
Shazam!
Sunrise Semester
Tattletales
The U.S. of Archie 
Valley of the Dinosaurs 
The Young and the Restless

New series
All in the Family 
Clue Club
Far Out Space Nuts
The Ghost Busters
Give-n-Take
The Secrets of Isis

Not returning from 1974-75
Bailey's Comets 
The Hudson Brothers Razzle Dazzle Show
Jeannie 
The Joker's Wild
My Favorite Martians 
Now You See It
Partridge Family 2200 A.D.
Spin-Off

NBC

Returning series
Another World
Celebrity Sweepstakes
Days of Our Lives
The Doctors
Emergency +4 
Go!
High Rollers
The Hollywood Squares
Jackpot
The Jetsons 
Josie and the Pussycats 
Land of the Lost
The Magnificent Marble Machine
Meet the Press
NBC Nightly News
NBC Saturday Night News
NBC Sunday Night News
The New Pink Panther Show
Run, Joe, Run
Sigmund and the Sea Monsters 
Somerset
Today
Wheel of Fortune

New Series
The Fun Factory
The Gong Show
Return to the Planet of the Apes
Sanford and Son 
The Secret Lives of Waldo Kitty
Take My Advice
Three for the Money
Westwind

Not returning from 1974-75
The Addams Family 
Blank Check
How to Survive a Marriage
Jeopardy! 
Star Trek: The Animated Series
Wheelie and the Chopper Bunch
Winning Streak

See also
1975-76 United States network television schedule (prime-time)
1975-76 United States network television schedule (late night)

See also
 1975-76 United States network television schedule

United States weekday network television schedules
1975 in American television
1976 in American television